The  is a private university founded in 1950 and located in Fukui, Fukui Prefecture, Japan. The university has undergraduate faculties in engineering, environmental and information sciences, and sports and health sciences, as well as a graduate department for applied science and engineering.

References

External links
Fukui University of Technology

Educational institutions established in 1950
Universities and colleges in Fukui Prefecture
Private universities and colleges in Japan
Engineering universities and colleges in Japan
1950 establishments in Japan
Fukui (city)